Irad Ortiz Jr. (born August 11, 1992) is a Puerto Rican jockey who has been a leading rider in the New York Thoroughbred horse racing circuit since 2012. He won his first Breeders' Cup race on Lady Eli in 2014, and his first American Classic on Creator in the 2016 Belmont Stakes. He won the 2022 Belmont Stakes on Mo Donegal. 

Ortiz won the Eclipse Award for Outstanding Jockey in 2018 after leading the jockey list by both number of wins and earnings. He had four winners at the 2019 Breeders' Cup event, including wins in both the $4 million Turf and the $6 million Classic. In 2019, Ortiz repeated the Eclipse Award by leading in both wins and second places, as well as establishing a single-year earnings record for North American horse racing of $34,109,019. He won his third straight Eclipse Award in 2020 after again finishing first on both the earnings and wins list.

Personal life
Ortiz was born in Trujillo Alto, Puerto Rico. His grandfather, also named Irad Ortiz, was a jockey, as was uncle Iván Ortiz. His younger brother, José Ortiz, is also a leading jockey in New York. "We support each other, but you know, when we go out there, we are jockeys," said José.
 
Growing up, one of his idols was Ángel Cordero Jr., the first Puerto Rican jockey to be inducted into the National Museum of Racing and Hall of Fame. At age 16, Ortiz enrolled in Puerto Rico’s Escuela Vocacional Hípica, a school for prospective jockeys.

Ortiz has a daughter, Sarai, born in 2015.

Career
Ortiz began his professional riding career at Hipódromo Camarero in Puerto Rico on New Year’s Day, 2011, winning 76 of 357 starts over the following months. In June, Pito Rosa, who works in the NYRA jockeys' room and was an old friend of Ortiz's grandfather, encouraged Ortiz to come to New York. Rosa also found an agent for Ortiz and acted as a mentor while Ortiz was settling in. Ortiz rode his first race at Belmont Park on June 17 and won his first American race on June 24 aboard Millennium Jet. He would finish the year with 151 wins from 1,016 starts.
 
In February 2012, Ortiz "lost his bug", meaning he was no longer an apprentice and lost the weight allowance given to one. Even so, his success continued. In June 2012, Ortiz got his big break when trainer Kiaran McLaughlin put him on the filly Questing in an allowance race. When the filly won, McLaughlin retained Ortiz for the Coaching Club American Oaks at Saratoga in what would become Ortiz's first Grade 1 victory. Ortiz and Questing would also win the Alabama Stakes, and Questing would earn the Eclipse Award for champion 3-year-old filly. Ortiz finished the year ranked #17 in North America by earnings. He finished second in the Eclipse Award voting for Outstanding Apprentice Jockey; his loss may have been due to spending the majority of the year as a journeyman rider.

In 2013, Ortiz won 224 races and vaulted to the #5 ranking in North America by earnings. Highlights included wins in the King's Bishop Stakes, Champagne Stakes and Carter Handicap. He took his first riding title during Aqueduct's 2012-13 inner track meet.

In 2014, Ortiz won 15 graded stakes including his first victory at the Breeders' Cup in the Juvenile Fillies Turf aboard Lady Eli. He tied Javier Castellano for the leading rider title (by number of wins) at Belmont Park's spring meet, then won the title outright for the fall meet. For the year, Ortiz finished third in North America by earnings.

In 2015, he rode Stephanie’s Kitten to a win in the Breeders' Cup Filly & Mare Turf and Lady Shipman to victory in the Turf Sprint. He was the leading jockey at the Belmont Fall 2015 meeting. Ortiz had his 1,000th North American victory on November 22, 2015 aboard Island Therapy at Aqueduct. He finished second in the North American jockey standings by earnings.

In 2016, Ortiz was unanimously voted the Jockeys' Guild Jockey of the Week for June 6th – 12th. Ortiz began the weekend by winning the Jersey Girl Stakes, New York Stakes and Easy Goer Stakes. He then gained his fourth stakes victory of the week by winning his first American Classic in the 2016 Belmont Stakes on Creator. "I thought Irad did a masterful job with all of his decisions," said Creator's trainer, Steve Asmussen. "He saved enough ground going into the first turn and stayed inside, and that gave us a chance to win." He again finished second in the North American jockey standings.

In 2017, Ortiz finished third in the jockey standings by earnings and first by number of wins. He was an Eclipse Award finalist along with his brother José, who won.

In 2018, he won the Eclipse Award for Outstanding Jockey after leading the jockey list by both number of wins and earnings. He won the Belmont spring/summer and Saratoga meets, the latter highlighted by a win in the Whitney Handicap on Diversify. He earned his 2,000th career win on September 15 aboard Gambler's Fallacy at Belmont Park. He won the Shoemaker Award for outstanding jockey at the 2018 Breeders' Cup after he won two races, the Juvenile Fillies Turf with Newspaperofrecord and the Filly & Mare Sprint with Shamrock Rose, plus scoring five more top four finishes.

Ortiz experienced a slowdown in business in the fall of 2019, finishing just ninth in the Belmont meet standings. However, he had an exceptional weekend at the 2019 Breeders' Cup with four winners, including Bricks and Mortar in the $4 million Turf and Vino Rosso in the $6 million Classic. "Some riders have a good rapport with certain horses," said trainer Todd Pletcher. "Irad and Vino Rosso really gelled, you could see there was great chemistry there from the first time he got on him." He finished the year ranked first by number of wins and earnings, and received his second Eclipse Award.

In 2020, Ortiz earned his third consecutive Eclipse Award, with highlights including a win in the Breeders' Cup Sprint with Whitmore. On June 3, 2021, he was hospitalized after he was thrown when his mount stumbled in a maiden race at Belmont Park after moving to the lead. Ortiz was struck by one of the trailing horses but the CT scans and X-rays came back clean.

Year-end rankings

References

External links
Richard Migliore on Irad Ortiz Jr (2011)
Puerto Rico's Ortiz brothers light up horse racing (2017)

1992 births
Living people
Puerto Rican jockeys
American jockeys
People from Trujillo Alto, Puerto Rico